Princeton is a town in Worcester County, Massachusetts, United States. It is bordered on the east by Sterling and Leominster, on the north by Westminster, on the northwest by Hubbardston, on the southwest by Rutland, and on the southeast by Holden. The preeminent landmark within Princeton is Mount Wachusett, which straddles the line between Princeton and Westminster but the entrance to which is within Princeton. According to tradition, in 1675, Mary Rowlandson was ransomed upon Redemption Rock, now within the town of Princeton, by King Philip. The population was 3,495 at the 2020 census. Princeton is a rural exurb, serving as a bedroom commuter town for nearby cities such as Worcester, Gardner, and Boston.

History
During King Philip's War in 1676, Native Americans brought their captive Mary Rowlandson to Princeton to release her to the colonists at Redemption Rock. The town of Princeton was incorporated in 1759, out of land that was previously part of Rutland. It was named after the Rev. Thomas Prince. In 1810, it annexed a piece of Hubbardston, and in 1870, it annexed a piece of Westminster.

Register of Historic Places
Princeton has five entries on the National Register of Historic Places:
 East Princeton Village Historic District: Roughly Main St., Leominster Rd. (added April 18, 2004)
 Fernside-Vacation House for Working Girls: 162 Mountain Rd. (added July 27, 2002)
 Princeton Center Historic District: Jct. of Hubbardston and Mountain Rds. (added March 26, 1999)
 Russell Corner Historic District: Merriam, Gregory Hill, East Princeton and Sterling Rds, Bullock Lane, (added February 22, 2006)
 West Village Historic District: Jct. of Allen Hill and Hubbardston Roads

Geography

Demographics

As of the census of 2000, there were 3,353 people, 1,166 households, and 959 families residing in the town. The racial makeup of the town was 96.75% White, 0.30% African American, 0.33% Native American, 0.95% Asian, 0.63% from other races, and 1.04% from two or more races. Hispanic or Latino of any race were 1.46% of the population.

There were 1,166 households, out of which 41.9% had children under the age of 18 living with them, 74.7% were married couples living together, 5.1% had a female householder with no husband present, and 17.7% were non-families. Of all households, 13.5% were made up of individuals, and 5.0% had someone living alone who was 65 years of age or older. The average household size was 2.87 and the average family size was 3.18.

In the town, the population was spread out, with 28.9% under the age of 18, 4.8% from 18 to 24, 27.8% from 25 to 44, 29.9% from 45 to 64, and 8.5% who were 65 years of age or older. The median age was 40 years. For every 100 females, there were 102.0 males. For every 100 females age 18 and over, there were 97.3 males.

The median income for a household in the town was $120,559, and the median income for a family was $152,884. The per capita income for the town was $54,940. About 2.7% of families and 4.4% of the population were below the poverty line, including 5.3% of those under age 18 and 9.3% of those age 65 or over.

Government

Education

Schools
Princeton is part of the Wachusett Regional School District.

The Thomas Prince School serves as the town's kindergarten, elementary and middle school (K–8).

Wachusett Regional High School (traditional public high school) in Holden, MA and Montachusett Regional Vocational Technical School (vocational/technical high school) in Fitchburg, MA are the two public high schools serving the town of Princeton.

Princeton is served by Mount Wachusett Community College, whose main campus is located in Gardner, Massachusetts.

Library

The Princeton Public Library was established in 1884. In fiscal year 2008, the town of Princeton spent 1.6% ($129,243) of its budget on its public library; approximately $37 per resident, per year ($45.31 adjusted for inflation to 2021).

Points of interest

Cornerstone Ranchers 
Harrington Farm
Mount Wachusett
Princeton Historical Society
Wachusett Meadow Wildlife Sanctuary
Wachusett Mountain Ski Area
Wachusett Mountain State Reservation
Redemption Rock
Hubbard farm

Notable people

 Daniel Davis Jr. (1813–1887) - inventor
 Ward Nicholas Boylston (1747–1828), gentleman, businessman, and philanthropist, lived in Princeton from September, 1804 until his death. He bequeathed $1000 to the town of Princeton for its church and minister and the support of indigent and deserving widows and orphan children
 Moses Gill (1734–1800), Massachusetts lieutenant governor and acting governor
 Louise H. Gregory (1880–1954), professor of zoology at Barnard College
 Ezra Heywood (1829–1893), anarchist, slavery abolitionist, and feminist
 Vanessa Marcotte (1989–2016), murder victim, whose case attracted national media attention
 Edward Savage (1761–1817), portrait artist, engraver, and early museum proprietor

Film references
 The 2001 film Shallow Hal had scenes shot in Princeton at Wachusett Mountain.
 The 2006 film The Legend of Lucy Keyes is a movie about Princeton and its old legend, about four-year-old Lucy Keyes, who follows her sisters to fetch some water from Wachusett Lake but vanishes and never returns to the house. Her mother, Martha, spends night and day looking for her and calling her name. Some believe Lucy and her mother Martha still haunt on and around Wachusett Mountain.

References

External links

  Official Princeton (town) website
 A brief history of Princeton
 Books.google.com: Vital Records of Princeton, Massachusetts, to the end of the year 1849.
 Hearts for Heat NGO Website

 
Towns in Worcester County, Massachusetts
1759 establishments in Massachusetts
Populated places established in 1759
Towns in Massachusetts